The Artforum Culture Foundation (ACF) is a private and independent nonprofit organization with headquarters in Thessaloniki, Greece, which promotes contemporary art and cultural exchange. The organisation also has offices in Athens, Cologne, Paris, New York City. It main focus is on art in Greece and the regions of the Greek diaspora. 

The exhibition centre, "Artforum-Vilka near the harbour" was initiated in 1996 with a retrospective of Helmut Newton in his presence.

The Foundation also aims through art to promote peace, social cohesion and the realization of independent culture. With its exhibition program the foundation supports emerging as well as established artists.

Projects 

The Foundation initiates supports projects (European Cultural Centre (EEC), The Network Project, "Icons of our time", Gulf Projects, Ostrale, and "Art and Religion"). 

It also operates as a partner for cultural activities of interest to artists,  galleries, collectors, local authorities and companies.

Research on important contemporary artists is one of the aims of the Foundation. In the field of photography, it has given attention to the works of Heinz Günter Mebusch (The Mebusch Estate) and the complete works of Vera Isler-Leiner. The Foundation also supports the work of Joe Brockerhoff, Sheila Elias, Michael (Mike) Jansen, Chryssa, Michalis Manoussakis, Stanislav Marijanovic, Mahmood Mirzaie, Masaaki Noda, Manolis Polymeris, Vangelis Pliaridis, Stefan Runge, Theodoros (Papadimitriou), Panayiotis Tanimanidis, Helmut Tollmann, and Heinz Zolper, and others.

More than one hundred art exhibitions with contemporary works of painting, sculptures, photographs and performance-art have been hosted by the Artforum Cultural Foundation, mostly in co-operation with the Tsatsis-Projects. Most of these are documented in catalogues and brochures.

References

External links
Artforum-Culture-Foundation website
Gulf Projects. From Dark to Light website
Ostrale . Internationale Ausstellung für zeitgenössische Kunst website

Cultural organizations based in Greece